The German Broadcasting Archive (Deutsches Rundfunkarchiv; DRA) is a non-profit foundation supported by the ARD. It was founded in 1952 as "German sound archive". The DRA covers essential aspects of the development of German broadcasting. Today it has two locations: Frankfurt am Main and Potsdam-Babelsberg (formerly Berlin-Adlershof).

Further reading

See also
 Rundfunk der DDR
 Jahrbuch Medien und Geschichte
 List of sound archives

External links 
 Official Site

Television archives
Sound archives in Germany
Film archives in Germany
1952 establishments in West Germany